HMS Gazelle was a  of the Royal Navy (the Catherine class was the British designation for the United States Navy's Auk-class minesweepers).

The force reached Copenhagen on 9 May, taking control of the German cruisers  and  after their surrender.

References

Catherine-class minesweepers
Ships built in Savannah, Georgia
1943 ships